Voices  is an initial 2007 compact disc by the University of Memphis Southern Comfort Jazz Orchestra recorded in the studio.  This was their 1st full-length feature CD release since an LP recording under the direction of Gene Rush in 1987.    Since the late 1960s this group has been consistently recognized as one of the top collegiate jazz ensembles in the country recently being invited to the 2011 Jazz Education Network Convention, the 2000 International Association for Jazz Education Convention, and touring Europe in 1998.  Musicians from this CD went on to study with Bob Brookmeyer at the New England Conservatory of Music, Indiana University, work professionally, and teach at universities.

Background
The University of Memphis Southern Comfort Jazz Orchestra CD Voices was recorded to present a wide range of music to include tunes arranged of past University of Memphis alumni Mulgrew Miller and James Williams.   Before this release the group was honored to be included on the 3 CD compilation Memphis Jazz Box in 2004 released by Ice House Records.  U of M Jazz Orchestra alumni include James Williams, Mulgrew Miller, Tony Reedus, Donald Brown, Bill Easley, and Bill Mobley.

Reception

"...that the playing is so impressive and has the feeling of being effortless on what must have been rather difficult charts to master...it is the rich ensemble sound that makes this CD most memorable"

JazzTimes.com (review 2008)

"Throughout Voices, the writing is quite colorful, adventurous and challenging"

JazzTimes.com (review 2009)

Track listing

Track Listing:

Recording Sessions
 April 15, 2004 at the University of Memphis, STUDIOS A/B, Jon Frazer and Jeff Cline - engineers
 April 9/10, 2005 at Young Avenue Sound, Memphis TN., Willie Pevear - engineer

Musicians
directed - Dr. Jack Cooper
1st alto saxophone - Isaac Daniel, Justin Johnson
2nd alto saxophone - Kreston Smith, Nadra Bingham
1st tenor saxophone/clarinet - Cedric Mayfield
2nd tenor saxophone - Cameron Ross, Damian Sanchez, Bryant Lockhart
Baritone saxophone - Eric Hughes, Justin Johnson
Lead trumpet/flugelhorn - Jamie West, Kyle Millsap
2nd (Lead) trumpet/flugelhorn - Brandon Potts, Marty Bishop
3rd trumpet/flugelhorn - Hunter McClure
4th trumpet/flugelhorn - Paul Morelli, Dave Lisik
5th trumpet/flugelhorn - Jamaal Wicks, Paul McKinney
Lead trombone - Andrew Earle, Tony Garcia
2nd trombone - Stephen Kirby, Andrew Earle
3rd trombone - Chris Tucker
Bass trombone - Cecil “Buster” Harris, Lauren Watson
Guitar - Jason Barden
Piano - Amy Rempel
Bass - Roy Murdock
Drums - 
Adjunct Faculty member Ed Murray performs all Latin and African percussion on tracks 2, 3, 5, 8 and 9

Production

 Producer, editing: Jack Cooper
 Co-jazz instructor of rhythm sections and groups for CD: Tim Goodwin
 Co-producer, mixing, editing, and additional recording: Dave Lisik
 Recording engineers: Willie Pevear, Jeff Cline and Jon Frazer
 Mastering: Mark Yoshida at Audiographic Masterworks, Memphis, TN
 Photographs: Kay Yager and Kofi Martin
 Artwork: Carol Morse and Edwin Olivera
 Manufactured: John Phillips, Select-O-Hits
 Liner notes: Jack Cooper, Marvin Stamm, and Ken Kreitner

Works from the compact disc
Strauss’s Swing is published by Increase Music, Inc./BMI (increasemusic.com)
Not Tennessee Waltz is published by UNC Jazz Press (UNC Jazz Press)
Samana is published by Sierra Music Publishing (sierramusic.com)

References

External links

Voices at All Music Guide
 Voices at Amazon
 Southern Comfort Jazz Orchestra Lifts Voices in New CD: September 19, 2007

2007 albums
Jazz albums by American artists
Big band albums
Mainstream jazz albums
University of Memphis